"Last One Standing" is the debut single of British girl group Girl Thing. It was released on 19 June 2000 as the lead single from their self-titled debut studio album. The track was written by Girl Thing, George Merrill, Eliot Kennedy, Mike Percy and Tim Lever, and produced by Kennedy, Percy and Lever. "Last One Standing" was Girl Thing's only UK top-10 hit, peaking at number eight on the UK Singles Chart. The track was a greater success in Australia, spending 14 weeks in the top 100 and earning a gold certification.

Chart performance
"Last One Standing" received major promotion and media attention and was expected to top the UK Singles Chart with ease. Record company executives funneled huge amounts of money into the promotional campaign, including an appearance at the top of the Eiffel Tower. Girl Thing even pre-recorded their congratulatory interview with BBC Radio 1; however, the song ended up charting at only number eight. In Australia, the song peaked at number 17, spent 23 weeks in the top 100, and was certified gold.

Track listings

UK CD1
 "Last One Standing"
 "Extraordinary Love"
 "Last One Standing" (video)

UK CD2
 "Last One Standing"
 "Summer Daze"
 Girl Thing interview

UK cassette single and European CD single
 "Last One Standing"
 "Extraordinary Love"

Australian CD single
 "Last One Standing"
 "Extraordinary Love"
 "Summer Daze"
 Exclusive audio interview
 Enhanced CD featuring video

Charts

Weekly charts

Year-end charts

Certifications

References

2000 debut singles
2000 songs
Bertelsmann Music Group singles
Girl Thing songs
RCA Records singles
Song recordings produced by Eliot Kennedy
Songs written by Eliot Kennedy
Songs written by George Merrill (songwriter)
Songs written by Mike Percy (musician)
Songs written by Tim Lever